The Nederlands Instituut voor BedrijfHulpverlening (NIBHV) is one of the organisations that deals with the training and certification of Emergency Response Officers in the Netherlands. 

Most medium to large companies are obliged to have some sort of Emergency Response Team within their organisation to aid in emergency situations.

NIBHV issues their own standards for Emergency Response Officers training and certification.

External links
Official Website for NIBHV

See also
Fire fighting
First Aid
SBN

References

First aid
Emergency services in the Netherlands
Safety
Risk management
Business continuity